John Bath is a former professional rugby league footballer who played in the 1960s.

Playing career

Championship final appearances
John Bath played left-, i.e. number 8, in Wakefield Trinity’s 21-9 victory over St. Helens in the Championship Final replay during the 1966–67 season at Station Road, Swinton on Wednesday 10 May 1967.

Club career
John Bath made his début for Wakefield Trinity during March 1966, and he played his last match for Wakefield Trinity during the 1967–68 season.

References

External links
Search for "Bath" at rugbyleagueproject.org

Living people
English rugby league players
Hull Kingston Rovers players
Place of birth missing (living people)
Rugby league props
Wakefield Trinity players
Year of birth missing (living people)